Charles Gerard may refer to:

Charles Gerard, 1st Earl of Macclesfield (1618–1694)
Charles Gerard, 2nd Earl of Macclesfield (1659–1701)
Sir Charles Gerard (politician) (1657–by 1701), English Member of Parliament for Middlesex and Cockermouth
Charles Gérard (1922–2019), actor in Édith et Marcel

See also